Lester Lionel Wolff (January 4, 1919 – May 11, 2021) was an American politician who served as a Democratic member of the United States House of Representatives from New York. He also held the position of president of the International Trade and Development Agency. In 2014, Wolff accepted the Congressional Gold Medal, the highest civilian award in the United States, on behalf of the World War II members of the Civil Air Patrol.

An expert in Asian affairs, Wolff was also the chair of the Touro College Pacific Community Institute, the author of numerous books on foreign policy, and the host of the weekly PBS show Ask Congress.

Wolff was the oldest living current or former member of Congress until his death in May 2021, and the last living member born in the 1910s.

Early life and education
Lester Lionel Wolff was born in Manhattan on January 4, 1919, to the Jewish family of Hannah (Bartman) and Samuel Wolff, a marketer who worked at Ruppert Breweries. Wolff graduated from George Washington High School in 1935 and New York University in 1939.

Early career
Wolff lectured at New York University from 1939 until 1941, and later became a department chair at the City College of New York. Wolff was part of the Civil Air Patrol during World War II. He was a squadron commander and a subchaser.

Wolff worked for the Long Island Press and The Bronx Home News. Wolff then founded his own firm, specializing in the food industry, and was executive director of the New York Conference of Retail Grocers. He became the producer and host of Between the Lines, a local television program, and the producer of a celebrity variety show starring Wendy Barrie.

Wolff remained active in philanthropy as a member of the United Jewish Appeal and B'nai B'rith.

U.S. House of Representatives
In 1957, Wolff was selected by the U.S. House of Representatives as chairman of the Advisory Committee to the Subcommittee on Consumer Study. Early in his life, he was a liberal Republican, but switched parties, disillusioned with the increasingly conservative direction of the Republican Party under Barry Goldwater.

He was elected to Congress in 1964 and served from January 3, 1965, until January 3, 1981. He initially represented the 3rd district but later through redistricting the 6th district. Wolff served as Chairman of the Asian and Pacific Affairs Committee, and the Select Committee on Narcotics Abuse and Control. He commanded the Congressional Squadron of the Civil Air Patrol, rising to the rank of colonel.

In Congress, Wolff supported the agenda of President Lyndon B. Johnson. He voted for Voting Rights Act of 1965 and for the creation of Medicare and Medicaid, and was an active participant in the civil rights movement, attending the funeral of Martin Luther King Jr. Wolff opposed creation of the Long Island Sound link. He was an opponent of the Vietnam War.  He was an enthusiastic advocate of stricter gun laws, even the sale of automatic-opening knives.

Wolff was known as one of the most 'travel-happy' representatives of Congress while in office, frequently going abroad on congressional 'fact-finding' tours.  During Wolff's 1978 visit as a member of a congressional delegation to the People's Republic of China (PRC), he met with Deng Xiaoping. The Deng-Wolff Conversation conducted during this time was credited for its particular importance in the establishment of formal diplomatic relations between the PRC and the United States. Wolff is the author of the Taiwan Relations Act, signed into law on April 10, 1979. The TRA was born of the need of the United States to find a way to protect its significant security and commercial interests in the Republic of China in the wake of President Jimmy Carter’s termination of diplomatic relations and a mutual defense treaty of 25 years. Wolff later leveraged his experience in Asian affairs to work as a paid lobbyist for Myanmar’s repressive military government.

Wolff introduced amendments to the White House-sponsored Foreign Assistance Act of 1969 to restore the initiative for direct peace talks between Israel and the Arab states. He also played a role in the Camp David Accords.

Wolff was defeated for reelection in an upset by 27-year-old Republican John LeBoutillier in 1980.

Post-congressional career

Wolff was the president of the International Trade and Development Agency. He was the director of the Pacific Community Institute at Touro College, and published numerous books on foreign policy. He hosted a weekly PBS show, Ask Congress, continuously since the mid-1980s. Due to his expertise in Asian culture and relations, Wolff was a well sought-after consultant. He was a director of the Griffon Corporation from 1987 to 2007. In 2014, he accepted the Congressional Gold Medal, the highest civilian award in the United States, on behalf of volunteers of the Civil Air Patrol who had served during World War II.

With the death of James D. Martin on October 30, 2017, Wolff became the oldest living former member of Congress. He turned 100 in January 2019. He was active on Twitter and continued to write until his death. He was a vocal opponent of Donald Trump's presidency.

In February 2019, Wolff donated his congressional papers to Adelphi University in Garden City, New York. In February 2020, the Oyster Bay National Wildlife Refuge was renamed the Congressman Lester Wolff Oyster Bay National Wildlife Refuge.

Personal life and death
Wolff married Blanche Silvers in 1940; she died in 1997. Lester was an observant Jew and prayed daily.

Wolff died at a hospital in Syosset, New York, on May 11, 2021, at age 102.

See also
 List of Jewish members of the United States Congress

References

Bibliography

External links

1919 births
2021 deaths
20th-century American Jews
20th-century American politicians
21st-century American Jews
21st-century American businesspeople
American centenarians
American consultants
Burials at Wellwood Cemetery
Congressional Gold Medal recipients
Democratic Party members of the United States House of Representatives from New York (state)
George Washington Educational Campus alumni
Jewish members of the United States House of Representatives
Men centenarians
Military personnel from New York City
New York University Stern School of Business alumni
PBS people
People from Oyster Bay (town), New York
People of the Civil Air Patrol
Politicians from Manhattan
Writers from Manhattan